England competed at the 1994 Commonwealth Games in Victoria, British Columbia, Canada, between 18 and 28 August 1994.

England were represented by the Commonwealth Games Council for England (CGCE). England joined the Commonwealth of Nations as part of the United Kingdom in 1931. England finished third in the medal table.

Medal table (top three)

Athletes and medals
The athletes that competed are listed below.

Athletics

+ heat competitor of the gold winning 4x400 team

Badminton

Bowls

Boxing

Cycling

Diving

Gymnastics

Shooting

Swimming

Synchronised swimming

Weightlifting

Wrestling

References

External links
 1994 Commonwealth Games - Commonwealth Games official website
  Commonwealth Games Medalists - GB Athletics Full list of Commonwealth Games Medalists

England at the Commonwealth Games
Commonwealth Games
Nations at the 1994 Commonwealth Games